Elections to North Ayrshire Council were held on 3 May 2007, the same day as the other Scottish local government elections and the Scottish Parliament general election. The election was the first one using eight new wards created as a result of the Local Governance (Scotland) Act 2004, each ward will elect three or four councillors using the single transferable vote system form of proportional representation. The new wards replace 30 single-member wards which used the plurality (first past the post) system of election.

Election results

Ward results

Changes Since June 2007
†Robert Barr quit the Conservative Party on 24 June 2010 and now sits as an Independent

By-Elections since 3 May 2007
A by-election arose in the Kilbirnie and Beith ward following the death of the Scottish National Party's Craig Taylor, and Anthea Dickson held the seat for the SNP on 14 October 2008.

A by-election arose in the Saltcoats and Stevenston ward following the resignation of the Labour Party's David Munn, and Jim Montgomorie held the seat for Labour on 25 August 2011.

References

2007 Scottish local elections
2007